Tosters is a district of Feldkirch, a city in the western Austrian state of Vorarlberg. The district has a population of 5381 people (30 June 2009) and an area of 4 square miles.

See also
 List of cities and towns in Austria

References

Feldkirch, Vorarlberg